Lynx–Ursa Major Filament (LUM Filament) is a galaxy filament. The filament is connected to and separate from the Lynx–Ursa Major Supercluster.

References

Galaxy filaments
Large-scale structure of the cosmos